Roger Fenwick (c. 1662 – by October 1701) was an English politician.

Biography
Roger Fenwick was the eldest son of William Fenwick (died 1675) of Irthington, Cumberland and educated at St. Edmund Hall, Oxford,  matriculating on 25 June 1678, aged 16. He entered  Grays's Inn in 1678 and was called to the bar in 1686. He inherited Stanton Hall, Northumberland from his grandfather in 1689.

Fenwick was a Member of Parliament (MP) for Morpeth from 1689 to 1695. He died aged approximately thirty-nine.

Family
Fenwick married Elizabeth, daughter and heiress of George Fenwick of Brinkburn, Northumberland; they had four sons (1 d.v.p.) and two daughters.

Notes

References

1662 births
1701 deaths
Year of birth uncertain
Alumni of St Edmund Hall, Oxford
Members of Gray's Inn
People from Northumberland
Year of death uncertain
English MPs 1689–1690
English MPs 1690–1695